

The Dr. Agustín Stahl Stamm House is a historic residence in Bayamón, Puerto Rico. Built in the 1840s, this Neoclassical house was the residence of internationally recognized Puerto Rican scientist Agustín Stahl (1842–1917) from 1865 until his death. The house was not only his home, but also his medical office, laboratory, and storehouse for his collections in natural history and anthropology. The house has been acquired and partially restored by the municipal government of Bayamón, which has long-term plans to establish a museum in the building.

Trained as a physician in Germany and maintaining only a modest income as a local doctor, Stahl nevertheless received honors in anthropology, natural sciences, and medicine by 1877. In the late 1870s, he entered the agricultural sciences in response to a sugarcane plague in Puerto Rico. In the 1880s, he published massive and well regarded reference texts on the zoology and botany of the island, and later important works in ethnology and demography. In the latter part of his life, he became a leader in public health efforts in Puerto Rico and published works in Puerto Rican history.

Stahl is also remembered for his advocacy of Puerto Rican independence. His liberal political views led to suspicion from Spanish colonial authorities and his arrest and brief exile to the Dominican Republic during the Spanish–American War.

The house was added to the U.S. National Register of Historic Places in 2011.

See also
National Register of Historic Places listings in Bayamón, Puerto Rico

Notes

References

External links
Summary sheet from the Puerto Rico State Historic Preservation Office 

Neoclassical architecture in Puerto Rico
Houses on the National Register of Historic Places in Puerto Rico
National Register of Historic Places in Bayamón, Puerto Rico
Houses completed in 1840
1840 establishments in Puerto Rico